WRSS (1410 AM) is a radio station broadcasting a Spanish News/Talk format. Licensed to San Sebastián, Puerto Rico, it serves the Puerto Rico area.  The station is currently owned by Angel Vera-Maury. Its station licensee is Radio Progreso, Inc.

External links

RSS
Radio stations established in 1984
1984 establishments in Puerto Rico
San Sebastián, Puerto Rico